Genç District is a district of Bingöl Province of Turkey. Its seat is the town Genç. Its area is 1,443 km2, and its population is 33,929 (2021).

Composition
There is one municipality in Genç District:
Genç

There are 68 villages in Genç District:

 Aktoprak
 Alaaddin
 Ardıçdibi
 Bahçebaşı
 Balgöze
 Bayırlı
 Binekli
 Bulgurluk
 Büyükçağ
 Çamlıyurt
 Çanakçı
 Çaybaşı
 Çaytepe
 Çevirme
 Çobançeşmesi
 Dedebağı
 Dereköy
 Dikpınar
 Dilektaşı
 Direkli
 Doğanca
 Doğanevler
 Doğanlı
 Doludere
 Döşekkaya
 Elmagünü
 Ericek
 Eskibağ
 Gerçekli
 Geyikdere
 Gönülaçan
 Gözertepe
 Gözütok
 Günkondu
 Güzeldere
 Harmancık
 Karcı
 Kavaklı
 Keklikdere
 Kepçeli
 Koçsırtı
 Meşedalı
 Mollaibrahim
 Pınaraltı
 Sağgöze
 Sarıbudak
 Sarısaman
 Sarmakaya
 Şehitköy
 Şehittepe
 Servi
 Sırmalıoya
 Soğukpınar
 Sürekli
 Tarlabaşı
 Üçgül
 Yağızca
 Yatansögüt
 Yaydere
 Yayla
 Yazılı
 Yazkonağı
 Yelkaya
 Yeniçevre
 Yenisu
 Yeniyazı
 Yiğitbaşı
 Yolaçtı

References

Districts of Bingöl Province